"Hear You Calling" is the debut single by English electronic duo Aurora, released in 1999. It initially reached No. 71 on the UK Singles Chart, but a re-release the following year charted higher, reaching the top 20 at No. 17 in January 2000. It also reached No. 1 on the UK Dance Singles Chart.

Track listing
Germany CDM (2000)
"Hear You Calling" (Radio Cut) (3:44)
"Hear You Calling" (Dark Moon Radio Cut) (3:15)
"Hear You Calling" (Fire And Ice Radio Cut) (3:10)
"Hear You Calling" (Dark Moon Remix) (6:22)
"Hear You Calling" (Condor Mix) (10:33)
"Hear You Calling" (Fire and Ice Remix) (6:58)

Germany 12" #1 (2000)
"Hear You Calling" (Dark Moon Remix) (6:23)
"Hear You Calling" (Original Mother Earth Mix) (8:44)
"Hear You Calling" (Fire and Ice Remix) (6:55)

Germany 12" #2 (2000)
"Hear You Calling" (En Motion Remix) (7:25)
"Hear You Calling" (Condor Remix) (10:35)

UK 12" #1 (1999)
"Hear You Calling" (Original Mother Earth Mix) (8:45)
"Hear You Calling" (Fire & Ice Remix) (6:56)

UK 12" #2 (1999)
"Hear You Calling" (Origin Remix) (9:48)
"Hear You Calling" (Blue Room Remix) (9:36)

UK CDM (2000)
"Hear You Calling" (Radio Cut) (3:44)
"Hear You Calling" (En Motion Remix) (7:25)
"Hear You Calling" (Origin Remix) (9:36)

Australia CDM (1999)
"Hear You Calling" (Radio Cut) (3:42)
"Hear You Calling" (Original Mother Earth Mix) (8:45)
"Hear You Calling" (En Motion Remix) (7:25)
"Hear You Calling" (Origin Remix) (8:38)
"Hear You Calling" (Blue Room Remix) (9:36)

Australia 12" promo (1999)
"Hear You Calling" (En-Motion Mix) (7:26)
"Hear You Calling" (Blue Room Mix) (8:37)

Charts

External links
"Hear You Calling" at Discogs

References

1999 debut singles
Aurora (electronica band) songs
1999 songs